The 1925 Coupe de France Final was a football match held at Stade Olympique, Colombes on 26 April and 10 May 1925, that saw CASG Paris defeat FC Rouen 4–2 on aggregate thanks to their victory 3–2 in the final replay.

Match details

First match

Replay

See also
Coupe de France 1924-1925

External links
Coupe de France results at Rec.Sport.Soccer Statistics Foundation
Report on French federation site

Coupe De France Final
1925
Coupe De France Final 1925
Sport in Hauts-de-Seine
Coupe de France Final
Coupe de France Final
Coupe de France Final